Come Back Mrs Noah is a British sitcom starring Mollie Sugden that aired on BBC1 from 17 July to 14 August 1978 with a pilot broadcast on 13 December 1977. It was written by Jeremy Lloyd and David Croft, who had also written Are You Being Served? which also starred Mollie Sugden. Come Back Mrs Noah was not a success, with some regarding it as one of the worst British sitcoms ever made.

Cast
Mollie Sugden as Mrs Gertrude Noah
Ian Lavender as Clive Cunliffe
Donald Hewlett as Carstairs
Michael Knowles as Fanshaw
Gorden Kaye as TV Presenter
Tim Barrett as Garfield Hawk
Joe Black as Garstang
Ann Michelle as Scarth Dare
Jennifer Lonsdale as Technician
Raymond Bowers as Professor Holzburger 
Robert Gillespie as Mission Control  
Harold Bennett as Priest   
Christopher Mitchell as Butler  
Norman Mitchell as Mr Noah  
Diana King as Mrs Carstairs  
Vicki Michelle as Maid  
Jean Gilpin as 2nd Technician   
Jennifer Guy as Ivy Basset  
Kenneth MacDonald as Space Hen

Plot
In 2050, British housewife Gertrude Noah wins a cookery competition, and is awarded a tour of Britannia Seven, the UK's new Space Exploration Vehicle. The craft is accidentally sent blasting off into space with a crew consisting only of Mrs Noah, proton physicist Carstairs, neutron physicist Fanshaw, lightbulb-changer Garstang, and BBC reporter Clive Cuncliffe. The series then centres on efforts to bring them back to Earth. The programme Far and Wide (a parody of Nationwide) features frequent updates read by Gorden Kaye. These reports present a reality in which Britain is the most successful nation on Earth, providing aid to countries like Germany and the United States.

Development
The series was originally intended as a vehicle for Mollie Sugden and to take her out of the usual setting she would be in. Croft was very worried that others would soon start work on similar projects so he wished to rush it past the BBC as soon as possible. He later said that 'It speaks volumes about the flexibility of the BBC at that time ... we rushed it along without any opposition at all. One of my concerns, when I spoke to [Head of Comedy] Jimmy Gilbert, was that everyone would soon be trying to do something similar in this area, because "space" was suddenly all the rage, so I was greatly bothered about the danger of duplication. So I told him that Jeremy and I had an idea that we really liked, and that we wanted to do a pilot, but that the idea was so "hot" that I'd prefer not to tell him what it was about. And Jimmy, to his eternal credit, didn't ask for a script, he didn't question it at all, he just told me to go ahead and do it.'

Production 
David Croft signed up Mollie Sugden as Mrs Noah who had previously appeared on another Croft and Lloyd sitcom Are You Being Served?. Also in the series was Ian Lavender who was known for his role as Private Pike in Dad's Army. Donald Hewlett and Michael Knowles played physicists Carstairs and Fanshaw, the two were already known to viewers as Colonel Reynolds and Captain Ashwood in the sitcom It Ain't Half Hot Mum.

Episodes
{{Episode table |background=#040605 |overall=5 |title=20 |director=18 |writer=18 |airdate=16|episodes=

{{Episode list
 |EpisodeNumber=1
 |Title=Pilot
 |DirectedBy = Bob Spiers
 |WrittenBy = David Croft & Jeremy Lloyd
 |OriginalAirDate=
 |ShortSummary=As part of her prize for winning Modern Housewife Magazine'''s cookery competition, Mrs. Noah visits the Pontefract International Space Complex (PISC) to tour the flight deck of Britain's £700 billion space station. She witnesses unproductive tea-making technology, tries on a pleasure hat, and is on the verge of testing the dream stimulation machine when the shuttle is accidentally launched into space, providing her a crash course in weightlessness. 
 |LineColor=040605
}}

 

}}

Other countriesCome Back Mrs Noah'' was also shown in the Netherlands, starting on 30 June 1979. It was also aired in Australia and on several public television stations in the United States including WPBT in Miami, Florida and WNED-TV in Buffalo, New York.

References
Mark Lewisohn, "Radio Times Guide to TV Comedy", BBC Worldwide Ltd, 2003

Footnotes

External links

1970s British sitcoms
1970s British science fiction television series
1977 British television series debuts
1978 British television series endings
BBC television sitcoms
David Croft sitcoms
English-language television shows
Television series set in the 2050s